Bulgarian Deposit Insurance Fund (abbreviated BDIF) is a legal entity, established under the Law on Bank Deposit Guarantee (LBDG). 

BDIF is seated at: 27 Vladayska Street, 1606 Sofia, Bulgaria

General Information

BDIF Establishment, Functions and Activities 
The Bulgarian Deposit Insurance Fund (BDIF) is a legal entity, established under the Law on Bank Deposit Guarantee and functioning since January 1999.

The BDIF activity aims at maintaining the stability of and the public confidence in the banking system. Its major functions include:

 determining and collecting annual premium contributions from all banks participating in the deposit insurance system;
 investing its funds in low-risk and highly liquid securities issued by first class issuers, and deposits with the Bulgarian National Bank (BNB);
 repaying in-full the insured deposit amounts of physical persons and legal entities up to the statutory limit;
 managing the resources of the Bank Resolution Fund; contributing to the efficient execution of the restructuring of credit institutions pursuant to the Law on Recovery and Resolution of Credit Institutions and Investment Firms;
 protecting creditors’ interests and controlling trustees’ activities under the terms of the Law on Bank Bankruptcy.

List of Banks Whose Deposits Are Insured by the BDIF 
BDIF guarantees full repayment of deposits in levs and in foreign currency up to BGN 196,000 (amount includes accrued interest) on the 'per depositor per bank' principle (for the BDIF member banks). 
Additional protection up to BGN 250,000 (EUR 127,823) for a term of three months is provided for the following types of deposits: deposits of individuals arising from transactions with real estates for residential purposes; deposits of individuals arising from amounts paid in connection with conclusion or dissolution of marriage, termination of a labour contract or civil service contract, disability, or death; and deposits arising from insurance or social insurance payments or from payment of compensation for damages from crimes or reversed sentence.

 Allianz Bank Bulgaria
 Bulgarian-American Credit Bank
 Bulgarian Development Bank
 Central Cooperative Bank
 D Commerce Bank
 DSK Bank
 Expressbank (former Societe Generale Expressbank)
 First Investment Bank
 International Asset Bank
 Investbank
 Municipal Bank
 Piraeus Bank Bulgaria
 Post Bank (Eurobank Bulgaria)
 ProCreditbank
 Raiffeisenbank (Bulgaria)
 TBI Bank
 T. C. Ziraat Bank – Sofia Branch
 Texim Bank
 Tokuda Bank
 UniCredit Bulbank
 United Bulgarian Bank

The credit institutions listed below are branches of banks from EU Member States and they do not participate in the deposit guarantee scheme in the Republic of Bulgaria since they are protected by the applicable home country scheme:
 BNP Paribas S.A. – Sofia Branch
 BNP Paribas Personal Finance S.A. – Bulgaria Branch
 Citibank Europe Plc. – Bulgaria Branch
 ING Bank N.V. – Sofia Branch
 Varengold Bank – Sofia Branch

BDIF Management Board 

 Matey Matev - Chairman
 Nelly Kordovska – Deputy Chairwoman 
 Irina Martseva – member 
 Borislav Stratev – member
 Valery Dimitrov – member

Membership in International Organisations 
BDIF is a founding member of the International Association of Deposit Insurers (IADI) and of the European Forum of Deposit Insurers (EFDI).

Deposit insurance
Banks of Bulgaria
1999 establishments in Bulgaria